

Major bridges 

See also 

 Transport in Brunei
 Rail transport in Brunei
 Geography of Brunei
 List of rivers of Brunei

References 
 Nicolas Janberg, Structurae.com, International Database for Civil and Structural Engineering

 Other references

External links 

 

Brunei
 
Bridges
Bridges